Sink was an unincorporated community in Raleigh County, West Virginia, United States.  It was located 5.5 miles southeast of Shady Spring.

References 

Unincorporated communities in West Virginia